Hunt House is a historic home located at Waterloo in Seneca County, New York.  It was built about 1830 and is a two-story brick dwelling with a distinctive pedimented portico supported by four Doric order columns.  The home was renovated to its current appearance in the 1920s.  The home is notable as the residence of Mrs. Jane C. Hunt who, on July 13, 1848, invited Lucretia Mott, Elizabeth Cady Stanton, Martha Coffin Wright, and Mary Ann M'Clintock to it to plan the First Women's Rights Convention in the United States.

It was listed on the National Register of Historic Places in 1980.

References 

Houses on the National Register of Historic Places in New York (state)
History of women's rights in the United States
Houses in Seneca County, New York
Women's Rights National Historical Park
1830 establishments in New York (state)
National Register of Historic Places in Seneca County, New York
Waterloo, New York
History of women in New York (state)